Neocollyris speciosa is a species of ground beetle in the genus Neocollyris in the family Carabidae. It was described by Schaum in 1863.

References

Speciosa, Neocollyris
Beetles described in 1863
Taxa named by Hermann Rudolph Schaum